This is a list of notable events relating to the environment in 1974. They relate to environmental law, conservation, environmentalism and environmental issues.

Events

Unknown 
The last confirmed record of the Japanese sea lion occurred.

February 
The Convention for the Prevention of Marine Pollution by Dumping from Ships and Aircraft, also called the Oslo Convention, an international agreement designed to control the dumping of harmful substances from ships and aircraft into the sea, was passed.

August 
The VLCC Metula oil spill occurred in Tierra del Fuego, Chile.

October 
The Energy Reorganization Act of 1974 was passed in the United States.

December 
 US president Gerald Ford signed the Safe Drinking Water Act.

See also

Human impact on the environment
List of environmental issues

References